Tim Boyer (born 11 August 1971) is a New Zealand cricketer. He played in thirteen first-class and sixteen List A matches for Wellington from 1997 to 2000.

See also
 List of Wellington representative cricketers

References

External links
 

1971 births
Living people
New Zealand cricketers
Wellington cricketers
Cricketers from Wellington City